Agnieszka Jadwiga Wieszczek-Kordus (born 22 March 1983 in Wałbrzych) is a Polish freestyle wrestler.  Wieszczek won a bronze medal in Women's freestyle wrestling 72 kg at the 2008 Summer Olympics.

She is the first Polish woman to win an Olympic medal in Women's freestyle wrestling.

In March 2021, she competed at the European Qualification Tournament in Budapest, Hungary hoping to qualify for the 2020 Summer Olympics in Tokyo, Japan.

For her sport achievements, she received: 
 Golden Cross of Merit in 2008.

References

External links
 
 
 
 
 

Living people
1983 births
People from Wałbrzych
Olympic bronze medalists for Poland
Wrestlers at the 2008 Summer Olympics
Wrestlers at the 2016 Summer Olympics
Olympic wrestlers of Poland
Polish female sport wrestlers
Olympic medalists in wrestling
Recipients of the Gold Cross of Merit (Poland)
Medalists at the 2008 Summer Olympics
Sportspeople from Lower Silesian Voivodeship
European Games competitors for Poland
Wrestlers at the 2015 European Games
Universiade medalists in wrestling
Universiade bronze medalists for Poland
Wrestlers at the 2019 European Games
European Wrestling Championships medalists
Medalists at the 2005 Summer Universiade
Wrestlers at the 2020 Summer Olympics
20th-century Polish women
21st-century Polish women